George Cattermole  (10 August 180024 July 1868) was a British painter and illustrator, chiefly in watercolours. He was a friend of Charles Dickens and many other literary and artistic figures.

Life and work

He was born at Dickleburgh, near Diss, Norfolk. At the age of fourteen he began working as an architectural and topographical draughtsman for the antiquary John Britton. Afterwards he contributed designs to be engraved in the annuals then so popular, then progressed into watercolour painting, becoming an associate of the Royal Watercolour Society in 1822, and a full member in 1833. In 1850 he withdrew from active connection with this society, and took to painting in oil. His most fertile period was between 1833 and 1850. At the Paris Exhibition of 1855 he received one of the five first-class gold medals awarded to British painters. He also enjoyed professional honors in Amsterdam and in Belgium.  Among his leading works are The Murder of the Bishop of Liege, The Armourer relating the Story of the Sword, The Assassination of the Regent Murray by Hamilton of Bothwellhaugh, and (in oil) A Terrible Secret.

He was largely employed by publishers, illustrating the Cathedral Antiquities of England produced by John Britton, the Waverley Novels, and the Historical Annual of his brother Richard Cattermole (his scenes from the wars of Cavaliers and Roundheads in this series are among his best engraved works), and many other volumes besides. He collaborated on illustrations for Dickens's The Old Curiosity Shop and Barnaby Rudge. Cattermole specialized in rendering scenes of chivalry, of medievalism, and generally of the romantic aspects of the past.

Cattermole is buried in West Norwood Cemetery, near the tomb of his first employer John Britton.

References

Further reading
Cohen, Jane R. Charles Dickens and his original illustrators (Ohio State University Press, 1980), chapter 5, p125 ff.

External links

 
Biography (Victorian web)
Works by Cattermole (Tate gallery, London)
Works by Cattermole (Scholars' resource)
Portrait of Cattermole (National Portrait Gallery, London)
 engraved by W Kelsall for Fisher's Drawing Room Scrap Book, 1832 with a poetical illustration by Letitia Elizabeth Landon.
 In Fisher's Drawing Room Scrap Book, 1834, as illustrations to Letitia Elizabeth Landon's poem :
 Dus Awtar Caves of Ellora, engraved by William Woolnoth
 Interior of Deer Warra, Caves of Ellora, engraved by William Woolnoth

19th-century English painters
English male painters
English watercolourists
English illustrators
1800 births
1868 deaths
People from Dickleburgh
Burials at West Norwood Cemetery
19th-century English male artists